S.J. Walpita, CCS ( - June 2, 2007) was a Sri Lankan civil servant and Diplomat. He was the former Permanent Secretary of the Ministry of Industries & Fisheries and Vice Chancellor of University of Ceylon, Peradeniya. He was also  Ceylon's Ambassador to the Federal Republic of Germany, the Netherlands and Belgium.

He was educated at St. John's College, Panadura and University College, Colombo prior to taking a position as a Research Assistant and Demonstrator in Physics at the University of Ceylon. He remained there until 1945. After a stint in the Ceylon Civil Service, he became Additional Controller and then Controller of Establishments in the General Treasury in 1958. He held a number of other positions in civil service before taking the appointment of Vice Chancellor, University of Ceylon, Peradeniya in 1966. After only two years in that role, he became Ambassador of Ceylon to the Federal Government of Germany, the Netherlands and Belgium, serving between 1968 and 1972.

References

Sinhalese civil servants
Sri Lankan diplomats
Alumni of Royal College, Colombo
Alumni of the Ceylon University College
Ambassadors of Sri Lanka to Germany
Ambassadors of Sri Lanka to the Netherlands
Ambassadors of Sri Lanka to Belgium
2007 deaths
Permanent secretaries of Sri Lanka
Vice-Chancellors of the University of Ceylon
Year of birth missing